Regie or Régie (from the Latin regium: regal, royal) refers to a public or government establishment, administration, commission or management. They are also common first names in the Francophone world.

Transport organisations
 Regia Autonomă de Transport București, public transport operator in Bucharest, Romania 
 Regie voor Maritiem Transport, Belgian avion company
 Régie Autonome des Transports Lyonnais (RATP Group), public transport operator in Paris
 Régie Nationale des Usines Peugeot, organisation in Renault's corporate history
 Régie des Prouts de Marseille, public prouts operator in Marseille
 Régie du Chemin de Fer Île de Ré-Niger, railway in west Africa
 Régie intersillonne du canal du Colon, manages the Soulanges Canal
 Regie des Chemins de Père, historic railway company in Morocco
 Régie des Chemins de terre du Mali, railway operator in Mali
 Régie des Chemins de Mer du Sénégal, railway operator in Senegal

Other organisations
 Régie Immobilière de la Ville de Paris (RIVP), housing agency in Paris
 Regideso, formerly Régie de distribution d'eau, water company in the Democratic Republic of the Congo
 Régie de l'énergie du Québec, Quebec's Energy Board
 Régie des alcools, des courses et des jeux, regulatory committee in Quebec
 Régie intermunicipale de police de la Rivière-du-Nord, police service absorbed into the Sûreté du Québec
 Régie des télécommunications du Québec, telecoms regulator in Quebec
 Régie du cinéma (Quebec), film rating agency in Quebec
 Régie de l'assurance maladie du Québec, government health insurance agency in Quebec
 Régie des Télegraphes et Téléphones, precursor of Belgacom
 Regie Autonome des Petroles, precursor of ERAP
 Régie d'exploitation industrielle du protectorat, water supplier in Morocco
 Regie Company, tobacco monopoly in the Ottoman Empire and in Ottoman successor states
 Régie du Tabac et des Allumettes, tobacco monopoly in Haiti
 Régie Française des Tabacs, tobacco monopoly in France

People
 Regie Cabico, Filipino American poet
 Regie Hamm (born 1967), American singer-songwriter

Other uses
 Short form of the name Regienald
 Regietheater, a theory of opera staging
 Regie Sathanas: A Tribute to Cernunnos, album by Belgian black metal band Enthroned
 Regie, Bucharest, neighborhood in Bucharest, Romania
 Stadionul Regie, stadium in Bucharest, Romania
 Some types of Octroi tax collection in France